Chester Hall, also known as Rye Hall, is a historic home located at Chestertown, Queen Anne's County, Maryland, United States. It is a large brick Georgian / Federal style Flemish bond brick dwelling constructed in the 1790s. The house measures approximately 48 feet by 36 feet and is two stories tall above a high basement.

Chester Hall was listed on the National Register of Historic Places in 1980.

References

External links
, including photo from 1978, at Maryland Historical Trust

Houses on the National Register of Historic Places in Maryland
Houses in Queen Anne's County, Maryland
Georgian architecture in Maryland
Federal architecture in Maryland
Houses completed in 1790
National Register of Historic Places in Queen Anne's County, Maryland